The burgstall of Wartleiten Castle is the site of a levelled, medieval hill castle situated at a height of  on the  Wartleitenberg, about 600 metres southeast of the church in Streitberg, a village in the market municipality of Wiesenttal in the county of Forchheim in the south German state of Bavaria.

No above-ground ruins of the old castle have survived apart from the remains of the bergfried or fighting tower.

Literature 
 Hellmut Kunstmann: Die Burgen der südwestlichen Fränkischen Schweiz. Aus der Reihe: Veröffentlichungen der Gesellschaft für Fränkische Geschichte Reihe IX: Darstellungen aus der Fränkischen Geschichte, Vol. 28. Kommissionsverlag Degener und Co., Neustadt/Aisch, 1990, pp. 35–36.

External links 
 

 

Castles in Bavaria
Hill castles
Forchheim (district)
Wiesenttal